Glengarry was a federal electoral district represented in the House of Commons of Canada from 1867 to 1917, and from 1925 to 1953. It was located in the province of Ontario. It was created by the British North America Act of 1867, and consisted of Glengarry county.

The electoral district was abolished in 1914 when it was merged into Glengarry and Stormont riding.

It was recreated in 1924, consisting again of the county of Glengarry.

The electoral district was abolished in 1952 when it was merged into Glengarry—Prescott ridings.

Members of Parliament

This riding elected the following members of the House of Commons of Canada:

Election results

1867–1917

|}

|}

On Mr. Macdonald's appointment as Postmaster General for Canada, 7 November 1873:

|}

|}

On Mr. Macdonald's appointment as Lieutenant-Governor of Ontario, 18 May 1875:

|}

As Mr. McNab was unseated, 27 June 1876:

|}

|}

|}

|}

|}

As Mr. McLennan was unseated, January 1892:

|}

|}

|}

|}

|}

|}

1925–1949

|}

|}

|}

|}

|}

|}

|}

See also 

 List of Canadian federal electoral districts
 Past Canadian electoral districts

External links 
Riding history from the Library of Parliament
Riding history from the Library of Parliament

Former federal electoral districts of Ontario